Alice Clarke (born 4 August 2001) is an English cricketer who currently plays for Lancashire and North West Thunder. She plays as a left-handed batter and can also play as a wicket-keeper. She has previously played for Cumbria and North Representative XI.

Early life
Clarke was born on 4 August 2001 in Blackburn, Lancashire.

Domestic career
Clarke made her county debut in 2018, for Lancashire against Worcestershire, in which she scored 2*. This was the only match she played for the side that season, and in 2019 she appeared in four Twenty20 Cup matches for Cumbria. She was the side's leading run-scorer, with 129 runs at an average of 43.00 and a high score of 47, made against Shropshire. In 2021, it was confirmed that Clarke is dual-registered with both Lancashire and Cumbria, and would be part of the Cumbria squad for the upcoming season, playing six matches in the 2021 Women's Twenty20 Cup. In the 2022 Women's Twenty20 Cup, she played for North Representative XI, scoring 77 runs in six matches.

In 2020, Clarke played for North West Thunder in the Rachael Heyhoe Flint Trophy. She played one match, against Northern Diamonds, in which she scored 1 run. She was retained in the squad in 2021 and 2022, but did not play a match in either season.

References

External links

2001 births
Living people
Cricketers from Blackburn
Cumbria women cricketers
Lancashire women cricketers
North Representative XI cricketers
North West Thunder cricketers